Jüri is an Estonian masculine given name. It is often a diminutive of the given name Jürgen. People named Jüri include:
 Jüri Aarma (1951–2017), actor, musician and journalist
 Jüri Adams (born 1947), politician
 Jüri Allik (born 1949), psychologist
 Jüri Alperten (1957–2020), conductor, pianist and music teacher
 Jüri Annusson (1884–1965), politician
 Jüri Arrak (born 1936), painter
 Jüri Ehlvest (1967–2006), writer
 Jüri Jaakson (1870–1942), businessman and politician
 Jüri Jaanson (born 1965), rower
 Jüri Järvet (1919–1995), actor
 Jüri Käen (born 1970), swimmer and coach
 Jüri Kallas (born 1967), translator, publisher and editor 
 Jüri-Ruut Kangur (born 1975), conductor
 Jüri Käo (born 1965), businessman
 Jüri Kaver (born 1974), politician 
 Jüri Kerem (1943–1993), caricaturist and portraitist
 Jüri Kork (born 1947), politician
 Jüri Krjukov (1954–1997), actor
 Jüri Kukk (1940–1981), chemist, pedagogue and Soviet dissident
 Jüri Liim (born 1940), politician, investigative journalist and long-distance runner
 Jüri Lina (born 1949), journalist, writer, music producer and film director
 Jüri Lossmann (1891–1984), long distance runner
 Jüri Lotman (1922–1993), semiotician
 Jüri Luik (born 1966), diplomat and politician
 Jüri Marksoo (1876–1941), politician
 Jüri Mõis (born 1956), businessman and politician
 Jüri Müür (1929–1984), film director and scenarist
 Jüri Nael (born 1975), choreographer, dance and physical theatre pedagogue 
 Jüri Okas (born 1950), architect
 Jüri Parijõgi (1892–1941), children's writer and teacher
 Jüri Parik (1889–1929), politician
 Jüri Pertmann (1938–2019), dissident and civil servant
 Jüri Pihl (born 1954), politician
 Jüri Pootsmann (born 1994), singer
 Jüri Raidla (born 1957), lawyer
 Jüri Randviir (1927–1996), chess player and journalist
 Jüri Ratas (born 1978), politician
 Jüri Rätsep (1935–2018), lawyer, politician and judge
 Jüri Reinvere (born 1971), composer
 Jüri Rummo (1856–1???), outlaw and folk hero
 Jüri Saar (born 1956), politician
 Jüri Sillart (1943–2011), film operator, director and producer
 Jüri Talvet (born 1945), poet and academic
 Jüri Tamm (1957–2021), hammer thrower and politician
 Jüri Tarmak (born 1946), high jumper
 Jüri Toomepuu (born 1930), journalist and politician
 Jüri Tuulik (1940–2014), writer and playwright
 Jüri-Mikk Udam (born 1994), rower 
Jüri Üdi, pseudonym of Juhan Viiding (1948–1995), poet and actor
 Jüri Uluots (1890–1945), politician
 Jüri Uustalu (1889–1973), politician
 Jüri Välbe (1911–1964), footballer
 Jüri Vetemaa (1956–2003), chess player and chess journalist
 Jüri Vilms (1889–1918), politician
 Jüri Vips (born 2000), racing driver

See also
 Juri (disambiguation)
 Jüri, settlement in Estonia, named after Saint George (Püha Jüri in Estonian)

References

Estonian masculine given names